Starsky and Hutch on Playboy Island is a 1977 television crime film directed by George McCowan and starring David Soul and Paul Michael Glaser. It was split into 2 parts as the first two episodes of season 3 of the Starsky and Hutch TV series.

Premise 
Starsky and Hutch investigate a series of murders among the delegates for a convention, which takes place on a tropical island.

Cast 
 David Soul as Det. Ken Hutchinson 
 Paul Michael Glaser as Dave Starsky
 Samantha Eggar as Charlotte
 Joan Collins as Janice
 Don Pedro Colley as Papa Theodore

External links
 

Starsky & Hutch
1970s American television series
American crime comedy films
American buddy cop films
American television films
1970s buddy cop films
1970s crime comedy films
1970s English-language films